"I Will" is Namie Amuro's 20th solo single under the Avex Trax label and is her second lyrical composition. Atypical of Amuro, "I Will" is an orchestral ballad. Released on Valentine's Day, it is her first single as a solo artist to not sell at least 100,000 copies.

Track listing
 "I Will" (Namie Amuro, Hiroaki Hayama) – 6:43
 "I Will in L.A." (Namie Amuro, Hiroaki Hayama) – 6:43
 "I Will with piano" (Namie Amuro, Hiroaki Hayama) – 6:07
 "I Will not sing" (Hiroaki Hayama) – 6:41

Personnel
Namie Amuro – vocals, background vocals
Will Wheaton – Chorus
Terry Bradford – Chorus
Maxayn Lews – Chorus
Alex Brown – Chorus
Bill Cantos – Piano
Maruyama Strings Group – Strings

Production
Producers – Hiroaki Hayama
Arrangement – Hiroaki Hayama
Chorus Arrangement – Kenji Sano
Strings Arrangement – Tatsuya Murayama
Mixing – Dave Ford, Jon Gass
Vocal Direction – Kenji Sano
Music Video Director – Masashi Muto

TV performances
February 15, 2002 – Music Station
February 16, 2002 – Pop Jam
February 18, 2002 – Hey! Hey! Hey! Music Champ Special
February 19, 2002 – AX Music Factory
February 24, 2002 – CDTV
April 1, 2002 – Hey! Hey! Hey! Music Champ Music Awards VI
April 5, 2002 – Music Station Special

Charts
Oricon Sales Chart (Japan)

2002 singles
Namie Amuro songs
Avex Trax singles